April's Daughters is a 2017 Mexican drama film directed by Michel Franco. It was screened in the Un Certain Regard section at the 2017 Cannes Film Festival, where it won the Jury Prize in that section.

Plot
Valeria (Ana Valeria Becerril), 17, is pregnant. She lives in Puerto Vallarta, with Clara (Joanna Larequi), her half sister, who is calm, but lives with depression and is overweight. Valeria does not want her mother, April (Emma Suárez), who has been absent for a long time, to know about her pregnancy but, due to economic limitations and the overwhelming responsibility of having a baby at home, Clara decides to call her mother. April arrives with a great desire to see her daughters, but we soon see why Valeria did not want to get in touch with her. It is "the story of an adult woman who refuses to feel 'overtaken' by her own daughters in generational terms, without realising that she has been left behind in more important aspects, such as emotional and psychological, among others."

Cast
 Emma Suárez as Abril
 Ana Valeria Becerril as Valeria
 Hernán Mendoza as Gregorio
 Ivan Cortes as Jorge
 Enrique Arrizon as Mateo
 Joanna Larequi as Clara

References

External links
 

2017 films
2017 drama films
2010s pregnancy films
Mexican drama films
2010s Spanish-language films
Films directed by Michel Franco
Mexican pregnancy films
2010s Mexican films